Lea Sölkner (born 24 December 1958) is an Austrian former alpine skier who was World championship title in slalom in 1978.

Biography
Born in Tauplitz, Styria.

Career
During her career she has achieved 10 results among the top 3 (1 victory) in the World Cup and competed in two Olympics (1980, 1984) and two World championshisps (1978, 1982).

Achievements
1984 Winter Olympics in Sarajevo:
 eighth place at alpine skiing Downhill
Alpine skiing World Championship 1978 in Garmisch-Partenkirchen:
 Gold at Slalom
 eleventh place at Giant Slalom
Alpine skiing World Championship 1982 in Schladming:
 fourteenth at Slalom
1984 Austrian Alpine Ski Championships
 first place at alpine skiing downhill
World Cup 
 1 victory in Slalom

References

External links
 
 

1958 births
Living people
Austrian female alpine skiers
Olympic alpine skiers of Austria
Alpine skiers at the 1980 Winter Olympics
Alpine skiers at the 1984 Winter Olympics